What on Earth is a Canadian news radio program focusing on environmental issues, broadcast on CBC Radio One. It is hosted by Laura Lynch.

It began as a summer 2020 replacement series, and it was continued as a regular season series.

External link
 Official website

CBC Radio One programs
2020 radio programme debuts
Canadian talk radio programs